Below are the squads for the Football at the 1979 Mediterranean Games, hosted in Split, Yugoslavia, and took place between 21 and 29 September 1979.

Group A

Egypt
Coach:

Greece Ol.
Coach:

Morocco
Coach:  Just Fontaine

Yugoslavia Ol.
Coach:

Group B

Algeria
Coach: Mahieddine Khalef

France Amateur
Coach:

Tunisia

Turkey B

References

1979
Sports at the 1979 Mediterranean Games